Dangerous Spring (Swedish: Farlig vår) is a 1949 Swedish crime drama film directed by Arne Mattsson and starring Karl-Arne Holmsten, Birger Malmsten and Jan Molander. It was shot at the Råsunda Studios in Stockholm and on location in Uppsala. The film's sets were designed by the art director Nils Svenwall.

Synopsis
After a prostitute is found murdered, suspicion seems to point towards a student.

Cast
 Karl-Arne Holmsten as 	Jur. kand. Bo Hagberg
 Birger Malmsten as 	Med. kand. Torsten Hjertgren
 Jan Molander as Fil. stud. Robert Croona
 Stig Olin as 	Teol. stud. Gustaf Eriksson
 Åke Grönberg as 	Stud. (bara stud.) Karl Larsson
 Eva Stiberg as 	Med. kand. Berit Lange
 Inga Landgré as Tvålflickan Ulla
 Else-Merete Heiberg as 	Fackskoleflickan Maud
 Julia Cæsar as 	Heliga Birgitta
 Wiktor Andersson as 	Sjätte Budet 
 Haide Göransson as 	Gullan Svan 
 Björn Berglund as 	Criminal detective
 Ludde Juberg as 	Nilheim, vicar
 Olav Riégo as 	Professor of anatomy
 Artur Rolén a s	Österholm
 John Melin as Customer in barber shop
 Victor Sjöström as Antikhandlare Bladh
 Börje Mellvig as 	Dr. Berg 
 Sif Ruud as 	Tjinonan 
 Hanny Schedin as 	Vendela 
 Birger Åsander as 	Cathedral Janitor 
 Arthur Fischer	as Singing servant

References

Bibliography 
 Hjort, Mette & Lindqvist, Ursula. A Companion to Nordic Cinema. John Wiley & Sons, 2016.
 Qvist, Per Olov & von Bagh, Peter. Guide to the Cinema of Sweden and Finland. Greenwood Publishing Group, 2000.

External links 
 

1949 films
Swedish crime films
1949 crime films
1940s Swedish-language films
Films directed by Arne Mattsson
Swedish black-and-white films
1940s Swedish films